Mopala is a genus of skippers in the family Hesperiidae. It consists of only one species, Mopala orma, the orma, which is found in Guinea, Liberia, Ivory Coast, Ghana, Togo, Nigeria, Cameroon, Gabon, the Republic of the Congo, the Central African Republic, the Democratic Republic of the Congo and Uganda. The habitat consists of wet forests.

Adults have been recorded on the pink flowers of a root parasite growing on a fig tree.

References

External links
Natural History Museum Lepidoptera genus database
Seitz, A. Die Gross-Schmetterlinge der Erde 13: Die Afrikanischen Tagfalter. Plate XIII 79 k

Erionotini
Monotypic butterfly genera
Hesperiidae genera